Port Talbot English (PTE) is a variety of Welsh English spoken in Port Talbot, generally by the working class.

Phonetics and phonology

Consonants
Consonants in Port Talbot English generally follow those of Received Pronunciation. Some phonological characteristics of consonants specific to PTE include:

 Consonants can be geminated by any preceding vowel except long non-close vowels, which is most noticeable for  fortis plosives and when they are in intervocalic positions. For instance, the plosives in these pairs are lengthened: lob–lobby, shunt–shunting and sit–city.
 The voiceless stops  have considerable strong aspiration , often as a weak affricate .
 T-glottalization is uncommon but may occur word-finally.
 H-dropping also often occurs.
  are postalveolar affricates , as in RP.
  is more often a tap  than an approximant .
  is always clear .

Vowels

Monophthongs

Length
 Unstressed long vowels tend to be shortened, as seen in free wheel .
 Sometimes, under the same environment as geminating consonants, short vowels can be lengthened as in casserole .

Quality
 The  vowel is tense, but unlike Received Pronunciation, it is long , as in the  vowel (see Happy tensing).
 Vowels corresponding to unstressed  in RP are as follows:
  in the inflectional suffixes -ed and -es;
  in the suffix -est;
  in prefixes like anti- and poly-.
 There is no contrastive  vowel.
 The horse–hoarse merger is absent in PTE, hence the words horse  and hoarse  are kept distinct.  is found in fortress and important, where the horse vowel may be found in other dialects that keep the distinction.
  is open-mid  in stressed positions. When unstressed, it may be slightly raised to mid .
 The  vowel is mainly . However long  does appear before the cluster  and the word palsy.
 The trap–bath split is nearly absent, although the word bath along with path, laugh and its derivatives, ghastly and last(ly) have a long  , yet just like in Northern England, the remainder of  words are short .
 The  words bad, bag and man are often found with long .

Diphthongs

PTE, like Welsh dialects such as Abercraf English, has preserved several diphthong–monophthong distinctions that other varieties have not. They include:
Thus the pairs blue/blew and grue/grew are not homophones.
It also occurs in the words insurance and surety.
 The spellings ,  and  following  are typically pronounced .
  can also be found in the word blue, and the sequence , such as flute, lunatic and Pluto
  is found otherwise, such as crew or glue.
However, these are subject to several exceptions:
 The  vowel is always diphthong word-finally or preceding a vowel. It is further seen in the suffix sequence , thus café, mosaic and patience are always . It is usually a diphthong before a nasal (strange and came), however proper names do have a monophthong (Cambridge and James).
 The  is a monophthong in  bait, gait, gaiter, Jamaica, raisin, traipse and waist.
The spelling  is diphthongal in roll, stroll and its derivatives, yet monophthongal elsewhere.
  is monophthongal in (al)though, and morpheme-final -ow (elbow and window).
 Own as a possessive adjective (such as your own) is monophthongal.

Elision and assimilation
 , at the end of a morpheme or word, are very commonly elided: not good and handbag , the latter with the assimilation of the nasal with the b.
 The indefinite article an (before a vowel) may be reduced to a, as in  apple .
 The schwa  is often elided although but it is also very common to retain it.
 The sequence co(-)op, like in the rest of South Wales, is characteristically pronounced like cop .
 Elisions in the phrases isn't it?

Phonemic incidence
 Motor is pronounced , and the strong form of their is pronounced .
 In an address, girl and man are pronounced with the  vowel .

The following features apply for only some speakers:

Prosody
 Intonation in PTE is similar to Abercraf English. One prominent pattern is that the main pitch movement is not necessarily confined to the stressed syllable but can be spread further, to the end of the word.
 Like in other Welsh accents, PTE tends to avoid having double stress patterns, making words such as Bridgend or icecream lose their secondary stress.

Grammar
 Ain't commonly used as a negation.
 The Northern Subject Rule is used in present-tense verb forms and extends to personal pronouns:  I goes to work, the birds sings and you says.
 Certain words have grammatical meaning unique to PTE, including after meaning 'later' and never as 'didn't'.
 Double negatives occur, much like in other vernacular English dialects.
 The prepositions on, by and for are used idiomatically, as is characteristic for South Wales accent: by here/there. Phrasal examples include what is on this? (what's the matter with this), there's times on him/her (he/she is in a temper), what's the time by you (what's a good time for you), you can't go by him/her (you can't depend on him/her) and there's gratitude for you (you're appreciated).

Vocabulary
 ashman — bin man, dustman
 cam — a stride
 crachach — used everywhere in Wales; a derogatory term used to refer to members of the Establishment in the country. It can simply refer to 'posh people'.
 lose — to miss (e.g. a bus)
 poin — to pester, to nag (from Welsh )
 troughing — guttering
 venter — to bet (from Welsh , a mutated form of )

Idioms
Examples of commonly-used idiomatic phrases in PTE:
 burnt to glory — burnt to the point of ashes
 gone home — said when a piece of clothing has worn out
 possible if — in PTE it specifically means 'surely it's not that case that...'
 sure to be — a phrase that represents 'certainly' or 'without a doubt'

References

Bibliography

 
 

Welsh English
Languages of Wales
Welsh English
Dialects of English
Port Talbot
City colloquials